This is a list of elections that will be or may be held in 2024.

Africa
 
 2024 Chadian presidential election
 
 2024 Mauritanian presidential election
 
 2024 Egyptian presidential election
 
 2024 Algerian presidential election
 
 2024 Malian presidential election, 4 February 2024
 
 2024 Rwandan presidential election
 
 2024 Somaliland presidential election, November 2024
 
 2024 Comorian presidential election
 
 2024 South African general election
 
 2024 South Sudanese general election
 
 2024 Tunisian presidential election, September 2024

Asia
 
 2024 elections in India
 
 2024 Indonesian general election, 14 February 2024
 2024 Jakarta gubernatorial election, 27 November 2024
 
 2024 South Korean legislative election, 10 April 2024
 
 2024 Sri Lankan presidential election, September 2024
 
 2024 Taiwanese presidential election

Europe
 
 Next Austrian legislative election
 
 Next Belgian federal election
 
 Next Croatian parliamentary election
 
 2024 European Parliament election
 
 2024 Finnish presidential election
 
 2024 Brandenburg state election
 2024 Saxony state election
 Next Thuringian state election
 
 2024 Georgian parliamentary election, 26 October 2024
 
 2024 Lithuanian parliamentary election
 
 2024 Moldovan presidential election
 
 Next Montenegrin parliamentary election
 
 2024 Azorean regional election
 
 Next Romanian legislative election
 2024 Romanian local elections
 2024 Romanian presidential election, November 2024
 
 2024 Russian presidential election, 17 March 2024
 
 Next Slovak presidential election
 
 Next Basque regional election
 Next Galician regional election
 
 2024 Turkish local elections
 
 Next Ukrainian parliamentary election
 Next Ukrainian presidential election
 
 2024 Greater Manchester mayoral election, 2 May 2024
 2024 London mayoral election, 2 May 2024
 Next United Kingdom general election

Americas
 
 2024 Salvadoran general election, 4 February 2024 and 3 March 2024
 
 2024 Dominican Republic general election, 19 May 2024
 
 2024 Mexican general election, July 2024
 
 2024 Panamanian general election, 5 May 2024
 
 2024 Peruvian general election
 
 2024 United States elections
 2024 United States gubernatorial elections, 5 November 2024
 2024 United States House of Representatives elections, 5 November 2024
 2024 United States presidential election, 5 November 2024
 2024 United States Senate elections, 5 November 2024
 
 2024 Uruguayan general election, 27 October 2024
 
Next Venezuelan presidential election

Oceania
 
 Next Australian federal election
 2024 Northern Territory general election, 24 August 2024
 2024 Queensland state election, 26 October 2024
 
2024 Palauan general election, 12 November 2024

References

Notes

 
2024
Elections
2020s elections